Cumwhinton railway station was a railway station serving the village of Cumwhinton in Cumbria, England. The station was located on the Settle and Carlisle Line and was closed in 1956. The station is still intact, including platforms, and the station buildings are now grade II listed structures.

History
The station was designed by John Holloway Sanders, who designed many of the other stations on the Settle–Carlisle line. It was listed as being a small (or minor) station in the original Midland Railway plans. It was opened with the rest of the on the initial opening of the line in May 1876 and had its station buildings on the down line (towards ). The station was afforded a three-road goods shed on the down side and a signal box just north of the station which closed in 1957.

The main station building is made of red sandstone with a slate roof, is privately owned & occupied and is now a grade II listed structure. Additionally, the Midland Railway provided four railway cottages for workers besides the traditional stationmaster's house.

There have been petitions and public appeals to re-open the station to passenger traffic.

Stationmasters
The first station master John Lambert was arrested in 1877 on a charge of conspiring with Edwin Westerman, superintendent of the permanent way, Thomas Errick, inspector of the permanent way, and George Mason Tickle, brick manufacturer, in the theft of 4,000 bricks, the property of the Midland Railway Company. The case was heard at the Manchester Assizes before Mr. Justice Lush. John Lambert was allowed by the Midland Railway to combine his position as stationmaster at Cumwhinton with that of coal merchant. The charge against him was that instead of sending his coal by the money-earning trains of the company, he sent them by the ballast train, which earned the railway company no revenue. The jury found that the station master, who had been guilty of irregularities, had not they thought committed a punishable offence and he was discharged. 

John Lambert 1876 - 1877 (taken into custody 3/10/77)
William J. Stowell 1878 - 1886 (formerly station master at Crosby Garrett)
G. Barker 1886 - 1891 (formerly station master at Little Salkeld, afterwards station master at Melbourne)
Isaac Scott 1891 - 1915
W.S. Balfour from 1915 
J.H. Ashton from 1945 (formerly station master at Willaston)

References

Sources

Disused railway stations in Cumbria
Former Midland Railway stations
Railway stations in Great Britain opened in 1876
Railway stations in Great Britain closed in 1956
John Holloway Sanders railway stations
Wetheral